The molecular formula C17H25NO may refer to:

 Eperisone
 Etazocine
 3-HO-PCP
 4'-Methyl-α-pyrrolidinohexiophenone
 PCHP 
 4-Phenyl-4-(1-piperidinyl)cyclohexanol
 α-Pyrrolidinoheptaphenone
 Vesamicol